Vietnam competed at the 2000 Summer Paralympics in Sydney, Australia. The country was represented by two competitors and did not win any medals.

See also
Vietnam at the 2000 Summer Olympics

References

Nations at the 2000 Summer Paralympics
2000
Paralympics